Jacob Freeman may refer to:
 Jacob E. Freeman (1841–1900), American politician
 Jake Freeman (born 1980), American hammer thrower